Love & Lies is a 2013 Philippine television drama thriller series broadcast by GMA Network. Directed by Mark A. Reyes, it stars Richard Gutierrez, Bela Padilla and Michelle Madrigal. It premiered on April 8, 2013 on the network's Telebabad line up replacing Temptation of Wife. The series concluded on June 7, 2013 with a total of 44 episodes. It was replaced by My Husband's Lover in its timeslot.

Premise
Edward Galvez, a Philippine Navy officer gets tangled in a web of lies and conspiracies when an organization kidnaps his wife. As the protagonist discovers the truth behind the crime, he uncovers a treacherous plot that threatens to turn his world upside-down. The true perpetrators of the crime may be closer to home than he dare think. As he thread to the maze of lies, blackmails, double-dealings, and betrayals, everyone becomes a suspect.

Cast and characters

Lead cast
 Richard Gutierrez as Edward Galvez
 Bela Padilla as Denise Salvador-Galvez
 Michelle Madrigal as Catherine "Cathy" Alcantara-Galvez 

Supporting cast
 Sid Lucero as Gabriel "Gabby" Romero
 Paolo Contis as Emmanuel "Manny" Perez
 Lloyd Samartino as Ramon Alcantara
 Lara Melissa de Leon as Consuelo Alcantara
 Bobby Andrews as Captain Jose Lorde Villamor
 Luz Valdez as Rosa Galvez
 Miguel Tanfelix as Marco Salvador
 Jeric Gonzales as Ryan Alcantara
 Thea Tolentino as Marissa Rivero-Alcantara

Guest cast
 Jade Lopez as Roxanne Salvador
 Neil Ryan Sese as Ricardo Salvador
 Gerard Pizarras as Ka Fredo
 Ian de Leon as Gardo Mendoza
 Shyr Valdez as Rosanna Rivero-Mendoza
 Aicelle Santos as Ligaya Salvador
 Alessandra de Rossi as Regina Perez

Production and development
The series—a fast-paced suspense-action drama, also dubbed as "suspenserye was conceptualized by RJ Nuevas and developed by Richard Cruz. The two began developing the show under the title Notorious in January and February 2013. The title was changed to Love & Lies during the early stage of production.

The production team picked the Philippine Navy as a major setting for the series. On March 13, 2013, the show's main casts Richard Gutierrez, Paolo Contis together with series' director Mark Reyes visited the Headquarters Philippine Navy (HPN) and paid a courtesy call on the Navy Chief, Vice Admiral Jose Luis M. Alano AFP. Aside from that, Gutierrez and Contis also signed up as Philippine Navy Reservists. On the other hand, Vice Admiral Alano assured the network that the Navy will provide its full support and assistance to the series and said "We look forward to this project in which we can show and highlight what the Philippine Navy is all about." He likewise briefed Gutierrez and Contis about the rigid training and life of a Navy Seal.

The series' director described the show as his "dream project". Regarding the amount of action and drama being laced in the series, Reyes said that "The nearest thing that you can compare it to is Taken. There's a lot of suspense. But at the same time, there's drama that is interwoven with it. The pacing is reminiscent of 24".

The show is designed for a nine-week run, contrary to the usual one season of thirteen weeks. The creative and production team were "committed to tell all, within that time frame," regardless of its performance in the ratings' game. Reyes further stated, "We're geared up for nine weeks and beyond that, it will be hard to pull it off. [...] Unlike other television series that drag on because they rate, these nine-weeks have been planned from beginning to end so the audience will get hooked."

Casting
Richard Gutierrez was cast as the series' main protagonist, Edward Galvez. Director Mark Reyes revealed that the actor came first before the concept of the show. Gutierrez had to undergo tactical shooting training [in preparation for the role] ahead of the other cast members. He also immersed himself the Philippine Navy way.

Michelle Madrigal, Sid Lucero and Paolo Contis were cast to play three equally important roles. Madrigal feels pressured, especially her character Cathy Galvez is the lynchpin of the series, said that "My goal for this role is to showcase my capabilities as an actor rather than show more skin."

The character Denise Salvador was initially offered to Lovi Poe. Bela Padilla took over the role. Padilla finds her "kick-ass" character as "[...] very interesting. I would have auditioned for it if it weren't offered to me. Coming from the drama series Magdalena, it's refreshing to do a character who is strong, loud and bubbly." In an interview, Padilla further stated that her character was pegged on a female version of Robin Padilla.

Filming
The production began on March 21, 2013. Some of the scenes in the pilot episode were shot in Philippine Navy headquarters in Sangley Point in Cavite City and in BRP Emilio Jacinto (PS 35) Philippine Navy warship. Series' director Reyes described the pilot ala-Crimson Tide. Other locations have also been featured, such as Antipolo, Rizal, Tagaytay, Binondo and in some part of Metro Manila.

Reception

Ratings
According to AGB Nielsen Philippines' Mega Manila household television ratings, the pilot episode of Love & Lies earned a 22.8% rating. While the final episode scored a 22.7% rating.

Critical response
The series has generated a generally positive response from critics. Mercy Lejarde, an entertainment writer from the tabloid Balita praised Bela Padilla's acting performances, said that "Lovi Poe's lose is Bela Padilla's gain." Dinno Erece of Show and Tell described the series "Exciting" and "he won't be surprised if the network extends it."

References

External links
 

2013 Philippine television series debuts
2013 Philippine television series endings
Filipino-language television shows
GMA Network drama series
Philippine action television series
Television shows set in the Philippines